Satureia may refer to:
 Satureia (wasp), a wasp genus in the subfamily Encyrtinae
 an older spelling of Satureja, a plant genus, when it was in Labiatae rather than Lamiaceae